No One Mends a Broken Like You is a song written by John Schweers, and recorded by American country music artist Barbara Mandrell.  It was released in August 1986 as the first single from the album Moments.  The song reached number 6 on the Billboard Hot Country Singles & Tracks chart.

Chart performance

References

1986 singles
1986 songs
Barbara Mandrell songs
MCA Records singles
Songs written by John Schweers
Song recordings produced by Tom Collins (record producer)